Shane Blay is an American guitarist and vocalist that performs primarily metalcore. He has performed with bands such as Oh, Sleeper, Between the Buried and Me, and Wovenwar.

Background 
Blay started his musical career in the late 1990s/early 2000s, with the band Evelynn. The band released a split EP before hiring on Nick Hipa. Blay knew Hipa since the age of 15. The band was signed to Pluto Records. The band disbanded in 2004 and the members went on their separate ways. Blay alongside Micah Kinard, James Erwin, Lucas Starr, and Ryan Conley formed the band Oh, Sleeper. The band has reached a decent amount of success, but Blay has stated that, contrary to popular belief, the band doesn't make much money. Blay and Kinard are the only remaining original members on the band. Briefly, Blay joined Between the Buried and Me in February 2004, but departed in September of the same year. In 2013, Tim Lambesis, As I Lay Dying Vocalist, was arrested and the remaining members, Hipa, Jordan Mancino, Phil Sgrosso and Josh Gilbert formed a new project called Wovenwar alongside Blay. Blay was the band's first choice for the vocal position. The band has recorded two albums, including Wovenwar (2014) and Honor Is Dead (2016). Blay has made it clear that he will remain in both Wovenwar and Oh, Sleeper.

Bands 

Current

 Oh, Sleeper (2006–present)
 Wovenwar (2013–present)

Former

 Evelynn (2001–2004)
 Between the Buried and Me (2004)
 Die Trying

Discography

Evelynn 
 Dreaming of the Fifth/Evelynn (2001)

Oh, Sleeper

 EPs
 The Armored March (2006, 1x1)
 The Titan EP (2013, independent)

Wovenwar
 Wovenwar (2014)
 Honor Is Dead (2016)

References

External links

American heavy metal singers
American heavy metal guitarists
Metal Blade Records artists
Christian metal musicians
Wovenwar members
Between the Buried and Me members